Trigonobela is a genus of moths of the family Crambidae described by Alfred Jefferis Turner in 1915.

Species
Trigonobela nebridopepla Turner, 1915
Trigonobela perfenestrata (Butler, 1882)

References

Spilomelinae
Crambidae genera
Taxa named by Alfred Jefferis Turner